McKissack may refer to:

People 
 Eliza Jane McKissack (1828–1900), founding head of music at the University of North Texas College of Music
 Fredrick McKissack (1939–2013), American author of children's books
 Jefferson Davis McKissack (1903–1980), Texas folk artist and creator of The Orange Show
 Moses McKissack Ⅲ (1879–1952), African American architect
 Patricia McKissack (née Patricia L'Ann Carwell; born 1944), American author of books
 Perri Alette McKissack, aka Perri Nixon (formerly known as Pebbles) (born 1966), American dance-pop and urban contemporary singer-songwriter

Other 
 McKissack & McKissack, an architectural firm in Nashville
 McKissack Ponds, a small lake in Franklin County, Florida

See also 
 McKissic
 McKissick (disambiguation)
 MacKessack (disambiguation)
 McKusick